Dark Impulse is a 2012 Spanish erotic thriller film directed by Mariano Barroso, which stars Leonor Watling and Miguel Ángel Silvestre alongside Nathalie Poza, Adriana Ugarte, Helio Pedregal and Josean Bengoetxea.

Plot 
Featuring the backdrop of corruption and careerism, the plot tracks the relationship between Eva, an implacable judge, and Rocco, an alluring male prostitute serving as a protected witness.

Cast

Production 
The screenplay was penned by co-penned by Mariano Barroso and Alejandro Hernández. Dark Impulse was produced by Telecinco Cinema and Lo mejor de Eva AIE production, in collaboration with Malvarrosa Media, Sentido Films and Kasbah PC. It was shot in Madrid and Valencia. David Omedes was responsible for cinematography whereas Pablo Más served as film editor. The film was scored by Arnau Bataller. Shooting started in October 2010 and wrapped by December 2010.

Release 
Distributed by Tripictures, the film was theatrically released in Spain on 10 February 2012.

Reception 
Nuria Vidal of Fotogramas rated the film with a 3 out of 5 stars score, highlighting the chemistry between the two leads as the film's best selling point, while pointing out at certain television movie resemblances as a negative point.

Javier Ocaña of El País observed a linearity in the male prostitute's character (who starts the film the same way as he ends it) and the absence of a real climax, yet, imperfections and some sequences lacking in plausibility  notwithstanding, considered the film "never slackens in its rhythm and it is commanded by a very adequate acting couple."

Jordi Batlle Caminal of La Vanguardia gave Dark Impulse 2 out 5 stars, deeming it to be a "convincingly crafted film but unable of instilling emotions in the viewer", declaring to be amused by the final plot twist.

See also 
 List of Spanish films of 2012

References 

Telecinco Cinema films
Films shot in Madrid
2010s erotic thriller films
Spanish erotic thriller films
Films about male prostitution
Films shot in the Valencian Community
2010s Spanish-language films
2010s Spanish films